Holly G. Frankel (born July 13, 1979), also known as Holly Gauthier-Frankel, is a Canadian voice actress and voice director. Frankel is best known for playing Fern Walters in Arthur, Sagwa in Sagwa, the Chinese Siamese Cat, Rita in Go Hugo Go and Hugo: the Movie Star, Teri in later episodes of What's with Andy?, Loulou in Wimzie's House, and Flora in the Cinélume's English dub of Winx Club. She is also known for her alter-ego as burlesque performer Miss Sugarpuss, of which Holly retired  in 2016.

Biography
Holly is the daughter of Ron Frankel and Mary Lou Gauthier, who were former members of Malcolm Tomlinson's band Milkwood. At the age of seven, she became a voice actress after work as a studio singer for commercials. Since that time, she has been active in Montreal's neo-burlesque scene, the English theatre scene, several different musical spheres, and has continued to do voiceover, film and television work. She attended CEGEP and then McGill University. While attending the Montreal World Film Festival in 2004, she discovered burlesque. She was in the midst of depression and had an eating disorder at the time, and she credits it with saving her life.

Filmography

Animation
 Lockette - PopPixie (Cinélume English dub)
 Penelope Truehart and Jody Goodheart - Fred's Head TV series (2008)
 Ezekiel Zick - Monster Allergy (2005)
 Flora - Winx Club (Cinélume English dub)
 Fern Walters - Arthur (1996)  and Postcards from Buster (2004)
 Sagwa and Chung-nee - Sagwa, the Chinese Siamese Cat (2001–2002) 
 Belinda - Mona the Vampire (1999–2006)
 Ernestine - Carrot Top  (1997)
 Loulou - Wimzie's House (1995–1996)                                      
 Teri - What's with Andy? (2003–2007)
 Julie and DeeDee - Caillou (1997-2003)
 Polly McShane - The Kids from Room 402 (1999–2001)
 Rita the Fox - Jungledyret Hugo (Danish movie series) (Miramax dub) (1998)
 Sam and Yoki - Jack (2011)
 Amanda Evans, Sarry, Ritchie, Young Sam Winchester - Supernatural: The Animation (English dub) (2011)
 Hua - Shaolin Wuzang
 Rosy Barb - Fishtronaut
 Bella - Spookley the Square Pumpkin (2005)
 Judith - Milo
 Rikki Chadwick- H2O: Mermaid Adventures 
 Holly - ToonMarty
 Sun - Trulli Tales
 Ping - Ping and Friends
 Felix and the Treasure of Morgäa (Félix et le trésor de Morgäa)
 Kid - Three Little Ghosts

Video games
 Amelys - Laura's Happy Adventures
 Nina - Evolution Worlds
 Vladanna and Operator - Still Life
 Sharon Judd - Rainbow Six Vegas 2
 Several Voices in Splinter Cell: Conviction, Assassin's Creed II and Hype: The Time Quest
 Vocalist that covered several songs for the music game Dance on Broadway for the Wii by Ubisoft

Film
 On the Basis of Sex (2018) playing Millicent

Voice Director
 Carnaval
 Just Say Yes
 Christmas Crossfire
 The Swarm

References

External links
 

1979 births

Living people
Actresses from Montreal
Anglophone Quebec people
Burlesque performers
Canadian female erotic dancers
Canadian female dancers
Canadian neo-burlesque performers
Canadian television actresses
Canadian video game actresses
Canadian voice actresses
Canadian voice directors
Comedians from Montreal
McGill University alumni